was a four-member jazz-punk fusion band formed in 2003 in Osaka, Japan featuring Mariko Gotō on vocals and guitar, Yoshitaka Kozeni on drums, Keigo Iwami on bass, and Hajime on keyboard.

Gotō often wore a serafuku while performing, and would climb speakers and crowd surf. The band initially formed to play covers of kayokyoku, but decided they weren't talented enough, and began to write their own songs. As they developed their influences included Italian prog, Kodo, J-pop duo Judy & Mary and Janis Joplin.

Their disbandment was publicly announced by Gotō on December 25, 2010, with their last show titled "Sayonara, Gotō-san" being played on December 28.

As a band, Midori released three albums, three extended plays, and two demos.

Band members
Official line-up
後藤まりこ (Mariko Gotō) - lead vocals, guitar (2003-2010)
ハジメ (Hajime) - keyboards (2004-2010)
小銭喜剛 (Yoshitaka Kozeni) - drums (2003-2010)
岩見のとっつあん (Keigo Iwami) - bass (2008-2010)

Former members
桑野嘉文 (Kuwano Yoshifumi) - bass (2003)
井尾良太 (Io Ryota) - guitar (2003-2004)
劔樹人 (Tsurugi Jujin) - bass (2003-2004)
矢野雅俊 (Yano Masatoshi) - vocals (2004)
博智 (Hirochi) - samples (2003-2005)

Timeline

Discography

Albums

Extended plays

Demos

DVDs
 初体験 (Initial Experience) (October 7, 2009; recorded June 6, 2009) AIBL-9179
 さよなら、後藤さん。 (Goodbye, Gotō-san) (April 6, 2011; recorded December 30, 2010) AIBL-9213 (limited edition: AIBL-9211)

Singles
 "Swing" (March 18, 2009) AICL-2003 (Bonus DVD Edition: AICL-2004)

References

External links
Midori official MySpace

Japanese rock music groups
Musical groups from Osaka
Japanese noise rock groups
Japanese jazz ensembles
Jazz fusion ensembles
Japanese punk rock groups
Musical groups established in 2003
Musical groups disestablished in 2010
2003 establishments in Japan
2010 disestablishments in Japan